"Cupid's Chokehold" is a song by American rap rock band Gym Class Heroes, featuring the vocals of Patrick Stump of Fall Out Boy. The song relies heavily on the music and chorus from Supertramp's hit song "Breakfast in America" written by Roger Hodgson. It peaked at number four on the Billboard Hot 100, number one on the Billboard Mainstream Top 40 radio chart, number three on the UK Singles Chart, and number three on the Canadian Hot 100.

It was first released in 2005 on The Papercut Chronicles, and re recorded for their album As Cruel as School Children (which was re released on November 4, 2006, with "Cupid's Chokehold" as an additional track). There are two music videos for this song, one for each version.

The second version includes female backing vocals, which are not included in version one. The second version of the video does contain the backing vocals of the first video. However, the female voice is integrated into the chorus behind Patrick Stump's vocals. The song has been featured on Discover and Download and Total Request Live.

Several versions were produced. The most common one features slow tempo and female backing vocals while the other one has a quicker tempo and Patrick Stump doing backing vocals, along with Rand Bellavia (of Ookla the Mok). The song won an ASCAP award on April 9, 2008, for being one of the most played songs in ASCAPs repertory from the end of 2006 through the end of 2007. As of September 2011, the song has sold 1,936,000 digital downloads.

Composition
Drummer Matt McGinley said,

Music videos

The Papercut Chronicles version
The first version of the "Cupid's Chokehold" video directed by Andrew Paul Bowser for the album The Papercut Chronicles features MC Travis McCoy working at a toy factory. While working, he stumbles upon a "prototype toy" which turns out to be a life size doll. The doll acts as McCoy's girlfriend in the video and fulfills his every wish.

However, she eventually becomes tired of being exploited and expresses this in a humorous scene where the two are playing Scrabble (she spells out the words 'krush', 'kill', and 'destroy'). The doll then begins to malfunction, and McCoy has no choice but to destroy her. He pushes her off a bridge, and she appears to be dead.

At the end of the video, she is awakened by Patrick Stump, who also appears to be a robot. The two fall in love and walk down the road together.

As Cruel as School Children version

The second version of the "Cupid's Chokehold" is the official video directed by Alan Ferguson for the album As Cruel as School Children and is a more literal interpretation of the lyrics of the song. The second version is more widely recognized because music networks such as MTV and VH1 play this version instead of the original, and because the original does not appear on iTunes. The video begins with a dancing Cupid (portrayed by Princetón), who shoots McCoy with a love arrow as he passes a girl, portrayed by actress, singer Porscha Coleman. Patrick Stump can be seen watching from behind a newspaper as this happens.

The two are madly in love at first, but as the video moves forward, the two begin fighting, and their relationship meets its end when McCoy's girlfriend walks in on him and his friends gambling. Cupid tries a second time to get McCoy into a relationship. This time, McCoy's girlfriend is more romantically involved with McCoy, but she becomes increasingly angry when he invites his friends to a party her parents are hosting. The relationship ends when McCoy comes home to find his girlfriend on top of a masked man in a compromising position. He proceeds to beat up the guy.

McCoy's final relationship is with one of his fans in the audience at one of the band's performances (played by McCoy's then-girlfriend, Katy Perry). Initially, she went up to him when they were at a bar. This time the relationship works out, and Cupid does not have to shoot McCoy with an arrow even though he is prepared to at first.

However, Cupid himself gets shot with an arrow by a female Cupid, and the video closes with the two of them dancing together with McCoy & Perry watching from in front. (Cupid also dances several times before the ending). In this version of the music video, when McCoy and his friends are interrupting his girlfriend's party, McCoy raps a small part of "Wejusfreestylin Pt. 2" from The Papercut Chronicles.

In the UK, some music channels had a re-edited version of the video with the party scene cut to a minimum (Party scene ends with girlfriend closing the door). 

Musically, this version has the word Girlfriend repeated constantly in the background not found in other versions of the song exclusive to the video.

Charts

Weekly charts

Year-end charts

Certifications

Release history

References

Gym Class Heroes songs
Patrick Stump songs
2005 singles
2005 songs
Fueled by Ramen singles
Music videos directed by Alan Ferguson (director)
Song recordings produced by S*A*M and Sluggo
Songs written by Rick Davies
Songs written by Travie McCoy